PortMedia, formerly PortMusic, is a set of open source computer libraries for dealing with sound and MIDI. Currently the project has two main libraries: PortAudio, for digital audio input and output, and PortMidi, a library for MIDI input and output. A library for dealing with different audio file formats, PortSoundFile, is being planned, although another library, libsndfile, already exists and is licensed under the copyleft GNU Lesser General Public License. A standard MIDI file I/O library, PortSMF, is under construction.

PortMusic has become PortMedia and is hosted on SourceForge.

See also 

 List of free software for audio

External links
 
 PortMusic website

Audio libraries
Computer libraries
Free audio software